Arthur Ernest Thompson (6 November 1871 – 26 June 1955) was an Australian rules footballer who played for the Carlton Football Club in the Victorian Football League (VFL).

Notes

External links 

		
Arthur Thompson's profile at Blueseum

1871 births
1955 deaths
Australian rules footballers from Melbourne
Carlton Football Club players
People from Williamstown, Victoria